Jack Hale may refer to:

Jack Hale (Australian footballer) (1913–2001), Australian rules footballer
Jack Hale (musician), American musician and player on Silver (Johnny Cash album)
Jack Hale (sprinter) (born 1998), Australian track and field sprinter
Jack Hale (swimmer) (1922–2008), British swimmer
Jack K. Hale (1928–2009), American mathematician